Ban Waen is a tambon (subdistrict) of Hang Dong District, in Chiang Mai Province, Thailand. In 2020, it had a population of 11,356.

Administration

Central administration
The tambon is subdivided into 13 administrative villages (muban).

Local administration
The whole area of the subdistrict is covered by the subdistrict municipality (Thesaban Tambon) Ban Waen (เทศบาลตำบลบ้านแหวน).

References

External links
Thaitambon.com on Ban Waen

Tambon of Chiang Mai province
Populated places in Chiang Mai province